Spring on the Oder is a 1967 Soviet drama film directed by Lev Saakov.

Plot 
The film takes place during the Great Patriotic War. The film tells about Major Lubentsov, who gets acquainted with military physician Tanya Koltsova, with whom he is selected from the environment, and then broke up. And suddenly, in April 1945, he meets her in Germany...

Cast 
 Anatoliy Kuznetsov as Lubentsov
 Anatoliy Grachyov as Chokhov (as Anatoli Grachyov)
 Lyudmila Chursina as Tanya
 Georgi Zhzhyonov as Ryzheusy
 Yury Solomin as Meshcherski
 Pyotr Shcherbakov as Sizokrylov
 Vladislav Strzhelchik as Krasikov
 Viktor Otisko as Slivyenko

References

External links 
 

1967 films
1960s Russian-language films
Soviet drama films
1967 drama films